The Alkumru Dam is a rock-fill embankment dam on the Botan River, located  east of Siirt in Siirt Province, Turkey. The dam was constructed between 2008 and 2011. It was inaugurated by President Abdullah Gül and Prime Minister Recep Tayyip Erdoğan on 19 May 2011. Its primary purpose is hydroelectric power generation and it supports a 265.5 MW power station. The first two generators were commissioned in March 2011 with the third and final in April 2011.

See also

Kirazlık Dam – regulator downstream
Çetin Dam – upstream, under construction

References

Hydroelectric power stations in Turkey
Rock-filled dams
Dams in Siirt Province
Dams completed in 2011
Alkumru